The 2023 U.S. Men's Clay Court Championships (also known as the Fayez Sarofim & Co. U.S. Men's Clay Court Championships for sponsorship purposes) is a tennis tournament to be played on outdoor clay courts.

It will be the 53rd edition of the U.S. Men's Clay Court Championships, and an ATP Tour 250 event on the 2023 ATP Tour. It will take place at River Oaks Country Club in Houston, Texas, United States from April 3 through 9, 2023.

Champions

Singles 

  vs

Doubles 

  /  vs  /

Point and prize money

Point

Prize money 

*per team

Singles main draw entrants

Seeds

Rankings are as of 20 March 2023.

Other entrants
The following players received wildcards into the main draw:
  
  
  

The following players received entry via the qualifying draw:

Doubles main draw entrants

Seeds

 Rankings are as of 20 March 2023

Other entrants 
The following pairs received a wildcard into the doubles main draw:
  /  
  /

References

External links

Official website

2023
2023 in American tennis
April 2023 sports events in the United States
2023 ATP Tour